Binka  was a British animated children's television series about the adventures of a large tomcat named Binka, who frequently travels to three houses for three meals a day. The show aired from 2001 to 2005 (four years, including repeats), running for twenty-six five-minute long episodes on weekday mornings and was first transmitted on BBC1.

Characters and settings
Binka – The main character in the cartoon. This blue and white tomcat likes Suki, chasing squirrels, hunting, eating, exercise and napping. He does not like Spit, bathing or being annoyed by the squirrel.

Suki – A purple female cat who likes Binka. She can be friendly to Binka but she can also be disdainful. She walks in a rather vain way.

Tango – The playful puppy who lives with the Lockett family. He likes Binka but he can be an annoyance to him. Nonetheless, Binka and Tango are good friends.

Spit – A scornful dark green cat who has a strong dislike for Binka and can be considered the "antagonist" of the show. He intimidates Binka and Tango.

Ollie – A ginger colored cat who usually pops his head out to see what Binka is doing. They are not enemies nor are they friends.

Mrs. Dawson – The owner of the first house section that Binka goes to regularly.

The Lockett Family – The owners of the second house section that Binka goes to regularly.

Mr. Bolt – The owner of the third house section that Binka goes to regularly.

Episodes

Series 1
Binka and the Three Suppers
Binka and the Pond
Binka and the Mouse
Binka's New Bed
Binka and the Quiet Place
Binka the Barbecue
Binka the Brave
Binka Helps out
Binka and Spit
Binka and the Noisy Night
Binka and the Snowy Day
Binka and the Pond Cat
Binka and the Itch

Series 2
Binka and the Butterfly
Binka and the Ball
Binka and the Treasure
Binka in the Jungle
Binka Takes a Ride
Binka and the Hot Day
Binka Goes Shopping
Binka and the Smell
Binka Gets Some Exercise
Binka and the Dark
Binka and the Squirrel
Binka Wants to Play
Binka in Love

DVD releases
In October 2005, a DVD of the series was released, featuring nine or ten episodes, titled Binka and Friends. This is currently the only DVD of this show ever released.

Foreign broadcasting
Binka has been translated into Welsh and is shown on S4C under the name of Binca. Also, it has been translated to Polish and shown on CBeebies, shown on 2: translated in Portuguese, and has been broadcast on ABC, ABC Kids and ABC2 in Australia, RTÉ2 in the Republic of Ireland, BBC Kids in Canada, MBC 3 in the Middle East, BFBS in Germany, Hop! Channel in Israel, TV Cultura in Brazil, Channel 33 in the U.A.E., Kids Central in Singapore and ERT1 in Greece.

References

External links
Official Site of Honeycomb Animation

2000s British children's television series
2001 British television series debuts
2001 British television series endings
BBC children's television shows
British children's animated comedy television series
Animated television series about cats
English-language television shows
2000s British animated television series
CBeebies
British preschool education television series
Animated preschool education television series
2000s preschool education television series